Lake Awoonga was formed on the Boyne River by the dam located  from Gladstone, in Central Queensland, Australia. It is approximately 30 minutes drive from Gladstone, via Benaraby.

Lake Awoonga is the main water supply for the Gladstone region. Its recreation areas and recreational fishery are provided free to locals and tourists by the Gladstone Area Water Board.

Specifications
Originally built across the Boyne River south west of Gladstone in the early 1950s as a 12m high mass concrete dam, it was raised by 6m shortly after. In the 1980s it was raised again, now as a rockfill structure with a concrete upstream face slab to a full supply level of 30m AHD. The dam was raised for a third time in 2002 to its current full supply level of 40m AHD. The embankment was formed from rock excavated from a quarry on the side of the dam wall. This design of the current dam allows for further raising, if necessary, through the addition of gates to the top of the spillway. The second raising of the dam was built by Thiess Brothers and was completed in March 1985.

The dam reached its lowest level of 7.44% capacity in February 2003, and its highest recorded level of 192.9% (8.3m over the spillway) in January 2013 as a result of heavy rain from ex Tropical Cyclone Oswald. The dam continued spilling from January 25th until early May.

When full the lake is 40 m (111 feet) above sea level. Approximately 200,000 fish are released each year including barramundi and some mangrove jack. By early 2006 a total of over 2.9 million fish had been released into Lake Awoonga including 2.4 million barramundii, 470,000 sea mullet and 15,000 mangrove jack. These fish were bred at Gladstone Area Water Board's Fish Hatchery facility. The largest barramundi caught, as at November 2008, weighed in at a 36.5 kg (80.5 lbs). Lake Awoonga is one of the only dams in Australia to have been stocked with mangrove jack.

Fauna
Lake Awoonga is home to an array of small animals, several of which are of conservation significance including the grey-headed flying fox and the yellow-bellied glider. Aquatic vegetation maintains an array of small animals that support the fish, eels, turtles, platypus and birds. Other species of birds, reptiles, and native fauna including bandicoots, rufous bettongs, kangaroos, wallabies, greater gliders, and brushtail possums can be found around the lake.

The lake hosts more than 225 species of birds. Species include the southern squatter pigeon which is listed as vulnerable and a further twenty-seven bird species listed on International Migratory Conservation Agreement Lists.

The Gladstone Area Water Board has a fish breeding program in place and breeds barramundi and mangrove jack for stocking into Lake Awoonga as well as some of the surrounding waterways. Approximately 200,000 fish are released into Lake Awoonga each year (200,000 barramundi and small numbers of mangrove jack). The fish are bred at a purpose-built fish hatchery, operated jointly by the Gladstone Area Water Board and the Gladstone Ports Corporation.

The hatchery is one of the largest breeders of barramundi fingerlings in Queensland and their mangrove jack breeding program has resulted in Lake Awoonga holding the largest stocks in Australia with more than 50,000 released. Other fish species include Agassiz's glass perch, banded grunter, barramundi, bony bream, eastern rainbowfish, eeltail catfish, fly-specked hardyhead, forktail catfish, gudgeon, long-finned eel, longtom, mouth almighty, sea mullet, snub-nose garfish and spangled perch. Also present in low numbers are Hyrtl's tandan, mangrove jack, saratoga, silver perch, sleepy cod, sooty grunter, and yellowbelly. Since 1996, over 2.5 million barramundi fingerlings and 470,000 mullet fingerlings have been released into the lake. Barramundi in the 10–25 kg range are regularly caught from the lake.

Flora
More than 415 plant varieties play a vital role in the health of the Lake Awoonga region. Ranging from vine thickets and rainforests to tall woodlands and grassy woodlands, they include over 45 confirmed species of aquatic plants such as ribbon weed, hornwort and sedges found in the shallow water areas. Aquatic plants have an important function in that they provide food and cover for animals, stabilise the river bottom against erosion and recycle nutrients.

Several plants of conservation significance exist in the region Awoonga including Persoonia Amaliae and Eucalyptus melanoleuca which are listed as rare, while Cycas Megacarpa and Grevillea venusta are noted as vulnerable. Banksia integrifolia and Xanthorrhoea latifolia are common protected species that can also be found in the area.

There are a number of declared alien plants and environmental weeds proliferating throughout the river system and the catchment including parthenium, salvinia, cat's claw vine, lantana, oleander and rubbervine. A pest management plan has been developed to supplement the annual weed control programme.

The Gladstone Area Water Board has carried out vegetation re-establishment programs in order to replace remnant endangered regional ecosystems impacted by the lake.

Recreation facilities
Swimming is permitted from the shore and there is a 24-hour boat ramp that provides access for sailing, fishing, and skiing etc.  Various watercraft, including house boats can be hired and organised. Fishing cruises are also available.
The waters of Lake Awoonga are controlled by Queensland Boating and Fisheries Patrol and Queensland Water Police and all users of the lake are required to adhere to the posted speed limits.

The lake is a popular fishing spot, especially for barramundi. The barramundi closed season does not apply to Lake Awoonga, although some limits do apply. Camping is permitted at two places on Lake Awoonga, the Caravan Park and the Boynedale Bush Camp. The main recreation area is provided free to the public and includes picnic shelters, barbecues, walking paths.

The Boynedale Bush camp is a basic camping facility around the southern side of Lake Awoonga, ten minutes from the townships of Many Peaks and Ubobo. Access is via a dirt road from the Gladstone to Monto Road which may become boggy in wet weather. There is no potable water at this site.

Glengarry Homestead
The area inundated by the dam includes much of the Glengarry pastoral station, making it unviable as a pastoral property and so it was purchased by the Gladstone Area Water Board on 1 August 1979. It is expected when the dam is at its highest levels of inundation, the heritage-listed Glengarry Homestead will be  on an island within the dam.

Gallery

See also

The Boyne Valley
Calliope, Queensland
Kroombit Tops National Park
Ubobo, Queensland
Nagoorin, Queensland
Builyan, Queensland
Many Peaks, Queensland

References

External links
 Lake Awoonga Fishing Information, Map & pictures
 Gladstone Area Water Board
 Map of Lake Awoonga

Central Queensland
Reservoirs in Queensland